The Apprenticeships, Skills, Children and Learning Act 2009 (c 22) is an Act of the Parliament of the United Kingdom. It alters the law relating to education.

The precursors of this Act were the white paper "Raising Expectations: Enabling the system to deliver" published in March 2008 and a "Draft Apprenticeships Bill" published in July of that year.

Commencement
See section 269 of the Act and the following Orders made thereunder:
The Apprenticeships, Skills, Children and Learning Act 2009 (Commencement No. 1 and Saving Provision) Order 2009 (S.I. 2009/3317 (C. 148))
The Apprenticeships, Skills, Children and Learning Act 2009 (Commencement No. 2 and Transitional and Saving Provisions) Order 2010 (S.I. 2010/303 (C. 25))
The Apprenticeships, Skills, Children and Learning Act 2009 (Commencement No. 2 (Amendment) and Transitional Provision) Order 2010 (S.I. 2010/1891 (C. 99))
The Apprenticeships, Skills, Children and Learning Act 2009 (Commencement No. 2 and Transitional and Saving Provisions) Order 2010 (Amendment) Order 2011 (S.I. 2011/882 (C. 35))
The Apprenticeships, Skills, Children and Learning Act 2009 (Commencement No. 3 and Transitional and Transitory Provisions) and (Commencement No. 2 (Amendment)) Order 2010 (S.I. 2010/1151 (C. 75))
The Apprenticeships, Skills, Children and Learning Act 2009 (Commencement No. 3 (Amendment)) Order 2010 (S.I. 2010/1702 (C. 88))
The Apprenticeships, Skills, Children and Learning Act 2009 (Commencement No. 4) Order 2010 (S.I. 2010/2374 (C. 115))
The Apprenticeships, Skills, Children and Learning Act 2009 (Commencement No. 5) Order 2011 (S.I. 2011/200 (C. 10))
The Apprenticeships, Skills, Children and Learning Act 2009 (Commencement No. 1) (Wales) Order 2009 (S.I. 2009/3341 (W. 292) (C. 152))
The Apprenticeships, Skills, Children and Learning Act 2009 (Commencement No. 2 and Transitional Provisions) (Wales) Order 2010 (S.I. 2010/2413 (W. 207) (C. 118))
The Apprenticeships, Skills, Children and Learning Act 2009 (Commencement No. 3) (Wales) Order 2011 (S.I. 2011/829 (W. 124) (C. 33))

See also
Education Act

References
Halsbury's Statutes,

External links
The Apprenticeships, Skills, Children and Learning Act 2009, as amended from the National Archives.
The Apprenticeships, Skills, Children and Learning Act 2009, as originally enacted from the National Archives.
Explanatory notes to the Apprenticeships, Skills, Children and Learning Act 2009.

Apprenticeship
United Kingdom Acts of Parliament 2009
United Kingdom Education Acts
Vocational education in the United Kingdom